Elena Barmakova  is Chairman of the Board of Fontvieille Capital Inc., a New York-based finance consulting firm.

Career
Elena Barmakova has over 17 years of international capital market experience in the successful arrangement and development of different special situations and cross-border opportunities. She received her Master's Degree in Finance and Economics and is licensed to transact real state and financial securities. Elena has worked with venture capital and investment banking firms in New York and Los Angeles. She is a regular attendee and speaker at such major conferences as the World Economic Forum, Milken Global Conference and Forbes Conferences.

Awards 
In 2009, Elena Barmakova was honored by the World Economic Forum as an active member of Young Global Leader (YGL) 2009. This honor is bestowed each year to recognize the two hundred most distinguished young leaders below the age of 40 from around the world for their professional accomplishments. Elena has completed the YGL executive education program 'Global Leadership and Public Policy for the 21st Century' at the John F. Kennedy School of Harvard University.

References

American women in business
Living people
Year of birth missing (living people)
21st-century American women